United Arab Emirates University (UAEU) is a public research university located in Al Ain, United Arab Emirates. Founded in 1976 by the country's first President, Sheikh Zayed bin Sultan Al Nahyan, it is the oldest university in the United Arab Emirates and offers courses in various subjects up to post-graduation.

History 
The United Arab Emirates University was established through the Federal Law No. (4) issued by Sheikh Zayed bin Sultan al-Nahyan, President of the United Arab Emirates on July 07, 1976.

Location
The university is located in the city of Al Ain, an oasis city in the Abu Dhabi emirate 140 km east of the capital city of Abu Dhabi and a similar distance from the city of Dubai.

Students 
Students come from all seven Emirates and more than 64 other countries. 6,696 students live on campus. In 2014 enrolled international students constituted 25% of the total enrolled students.

Rankings
The United Arab Emirates University is continuously ranked as the second top university in the United Arab Emirates after Khalifa university, and the 4th in the GCC. The university is ranked as the 5th in the Arab region, the 284th in the world in the 2021 QS World University Rankings. In the 2021 QS Top 50 Under 50, i.e. the top 50 world universities that were founded within the past 50 years, UAEU was ranked number 27.

In its capacity as a business school, UAEU was placed as the third best business school in Africa and the Middle East in the 2010 QS Global 200 Business Schools Report. As a research university the UAEU is ranked as number one in the GCC countries, number two in the Arab World, and ninth in the Muslim world. It was ranked the best 86th university in Asia by Times higher education:Asia university ranking

Structure
The Vice-Chancellor is responsible for the management of the university as well as policy and strategic planning, budget and financial activities, external relations, and alumni. The Provost is the Chief Academic Officer responsible for the Colleges, undergraduate studies, research and graduate studies, and information technology. He is assisted by the Deputy Provost. The Secretary General is responsible for services including finance, budget, facilities management, human resources, auxiliary services, and safety. The Deans are the heads of the academic colleges, which are groupings of academic disciplines, through which the academic staff teach at undergraduate and post graduate levels, and conduct research and scholarship.

The UAEU has undergraduate and postgraduate degree programs in nine colleges:
College of Business and Economics
College of Education
College of Engineering
College of Agriculture and Veterinary Medicine
College of Humanities and Social Sciences
College of Information Technology
College of Law
College of Medicine and Health Sciences
College of Science

The University Foundations Program prepares students for academic degree programs with pre-university courses in English, Arabic and Mathematics and other support in making the transition from school to university.

In addition to undergraduate and graduate programs, the UAEU conducts continuous education courses and vocational certificates for the community across all disciplines and hosts the Emirates Health Services, which provides medical skills training.

Faculty
Ibrahim Galadari, professor and dermatologist

Symposiums

Biological Sciences

In November 2016, the University held its first ever symposium on Biological Sciences "GENOMICS & BIOINFORMATICS" attended by experts from different parts of the world.

Research
The university launched the first PhD program at a national university in the UAE. As a research institution it attracts national, international, and industrial grants. PhD programs and professional doctorate degrees cover a range including Pharmacy, Public Health, and a Doctorate of Business Administration.

The university hosts research centers including the Zayed Center for Health Sciences and the National Water Center.

Notable alumni 
 Mansour bin Zayed Al Nahyan, deputy prime minister and minister of presidential affairs of the United Arab Emirates
 Saif bin Zayed Al Nahyan, minister of interior and deputy prime minister of the United Arab Emirates
 Abdullah bin Zayed Al Nahyan, minister of foreign affairs of the United Arab Emirates
 Hamdan bin Mubarak Al Nahyan, minister of Higher Education and Scientific Research of the United Arab Emirates
 Hamdan bin Zayed Al Nahyan, former minister of foreign affairs of the United Arab Emirates and former deputy prime minister
 Ahmed bin Zayed Al Nahyan, former managing director of Abu Dhabi Investment Authority, was regarded as the 27th most powerful person in the world by Forbes in 2009 before his death
Shaykha al-Nakhi, pioneering female short story writer
 Maryam Al Roumi, minister of social affairs of the United Arab Emirates and the second woman to hold a cabinet post in the history of United Arab Emirates, listed among top 10 most powerful Arab women in government by Forbes
 Saqr Ghobash, minister of labour of the United Arab Emirates and former ambassador to the United States of America and Mexico
 Abdul Rahman Al Oweis, minister of health in the United Arab Emirates
 Fatima Al Jaber, first woman to be elected to the Abu Dhabi Chamber of Commerce board of directors in December 2009. As of 2014, she is listed as the 94th most powerful woman in the world by Forbes
 Amal Al Qubaisi, first woman to be elected to the UAE’s Federal National Council, first woman appointed to Abu Dhabi Executive Council
 Najla Al Qassimi, UAE's first female ambassador, ambassador of the United Arab Emirates to Portugal, former ambassador to Sweden
 Essa Al Basha Al Noaimi, ambassador of the United Arab Emirates to the Islamic Republic of Pakistan
 Salma Hareb, Chief Executive Officer at Jafza (Dubai free zone), the first female in the Middle East and North Africa to be appointed head of an economic free zone, ranked as the 2nd most powerful Arab woman in government by Forbes
 Mariam Al Mansouri, first woman to fly combat fighters in UAE
 Noura Al Kaabi, minister of culture and knowledge development
 Abdul Qader Al Rais, Emirati artist
 Khadem Al Qubaisi, Emirati businessman and the former managing director of the International Petroleum Investment Company (IPIC).

See also 

 List of schools in the United Arab Emirates
 List of universities in the United Arab Emirates
 Education in the United Arab Emirates
 University of Wollongong in Dubai

References

 
Universities and colleges in the Emirate of Abu Dhabi
Universities and colleges in the United Arab Emirates
Buildings and structures in Al Ain
Education in Al Ain
Educational institutions established in 1976
1976 establishments in the United Arab Emirates